Glyphipterix pertenuis is a species of sedge moth in the genus Glyphipterix. It was described by Alexey Diakonoff in 1979. It is found in Tunisia.

References

Moths described in 1979
Glyphipterigidae
Endemic fauna of Tunisia
Moths of Africa